Richard J. Arneson is an American philosopher specializing in political philosophy who has taught at the University of California, San Diego since 1973. He chaired the department during 1992–1996 and served as graduate adviser. In 1996, he also served as visiting professor in the ethics, politics, and economics program at Yale University. Arneson earned his PhD in philosophy from the University of California, Berkeley, in 1975. His work has largely focused on utilitarianism and on luck egalitarianism. He is also a proponent of prioritarianism.

Arneson has also critiqued Marxism, arguing that capitalism was exploitative for more complex reasons than the labour theory of value accounted for. He argued that surplus transfer was only wrong when it was the result of an unequal distribution of social goods. Therefore, under capitalism, the majority of exchanges are inherently exploitative because the benefits end up in the hands of those who do not need it. Nonetheless, he says, surplus transfer is legitimate when it arises independently or when it is used to compensate the unequal distribution of natural endowments and wealth. Arneson has also contributed to debates concerning obligations from involuntary benefits, arguing that in some instances the "voluntary acceptance" condition ought to be relaxed.

See also 
 American philosophy
 List of American philosophers

References

External links 
 Faculty page

Living people
Philosophers from California
Philosophers from Connecticut
University of California, San Diego faculty
Yale University faculty
UC Berkeley College of Letters and Science alumni
Political philosophers
21st-century American philosophers
Year of birth missing (living people)